There are several rivers called the Roseau River:

Roseau River (Dominica), in Dominica
Roseau River (Manitoba–Minnesota), in the Canadian province of Manitoba and the U.S. state of Minnesota
Roseau River, Manitoba, an unincorporated community in the Municipality of Emerson – Franklin, Manitoba, Canada
Roseau River (Saint Lucia), in Saint Lucia

See also
Roseau (disambiguation)
Roseau River Anishinabe First Nation